A list of animated feature films first released in 1988.

Highest-grossing animated films of the year

See also
 List of animated television series of 1988

References

 Feature films
1988
1988-related lists